The Third Development Cabinet is the name of the cabinet of the Indonesian government led by President Soeharto and Vice President Adam Malik. This cabinet was announced on March 29, 1978 and served since March 31, 1978 to March 16, 1983.

The Sapta Krida of Third Development Cabinet are as follows:
The establishment of an environment and a situation which will ensure social justice for the people through the equity of Development and its results.
The accomplishment of high economic growth.
The consolidation of an ever stronger National Stability.
The creation of a clean and legitimate State Apparatus.
The continuing development of a stronger national unity and oneness with the Guide to Learn and Apply Pancasila (P4) as its foundation.
The holding of a direct, universal, free, and secret Legislative Election with the aim of strengthening Pancasila Democracy.
Further developing a free and active foreign policy for the sake of National Interest and with the aim of strengthening National Resilience.

Cabinet Leaders

Cabinet Members

Ministers 
The following are the ministers of the Third Development Cabinet.

Departmental Ministers
Minister of Home Affairs: Gen. Amirmachmud
Minister of Foreign Affairs: Mochtar Kusumaatmadja
Minister of Defense and Security/Commander of the Armed Forces of the Republic: Gen. M. Jusuf
Minister of Justice: Mujono
Minister of Information: Lt. Gen. (ret) Ali Murtopo
Minister of Finance: Ali Wardhana
Minister of Trade and Cooperatives: Radius Prawiro
Minister of Agriculture: Sudarsono Hadisaputro
Minister of Industry: Suhud
Minister of Mines and Energy: Subroto
Minister of Public Works: Purnomosidi Hadisaroso
Minister of Transportation: Air Marshal (ret.) Rusmin Nurjadin
Minister of Education and Culture: Daoed Joesoef
Minister of Health: Suwardjono Suryaningrat
Minister of Religious Affairs: Lt. Gen. (ret.) Alamsjah Prawiranegara
Minister of Social Affairs: Sapardjo

State Ministers
State Minister/State Secretary: Lt. Gen. Sudharmono
State Minister of State Apparatus Control: J. B. Sumarlin
State Minister of Development Supervision and Environment: Emil Salim
State Minister of Research and Technology: B. J. Habibie

Junior Ministers
Junior Minister of Housing: Cosmas Batubara
Junior Minister of Cooperatives: Maj. Gen. Bustanil Arifin
Junior Minister of Female Empowerment: Lasijah Susanto
Junior Minister of Youth Affairs: Lt. Col. Abdul Gafur

Official With Ministerial status 
Attorney General: Ali Said
Governor of the Central Bank: Rachmat Saleh
Commander of the Operational Command for the Restoration of Security and Order (KOPKAMTIB): Admiral Sudomo
KOPKAMTIB Chief of Staff: Maj. Gen. Daryatmo

Changes
May 1978: Daryatmo retired from the armed forces as KOPKAMTIB Chief of Staff to assume the office of Chairman of MPR/Speaker of the People's Representative Council (DPR). He was replaced by Lt. Gen. Yoga Sugama.
October 1982: Amirmachmud resigned as Minister of Home Affairs and became Chairman of MPR/Speaker of DPR, replacing Daryatmo. Sudharmono was later appointed to the Ministry of Home Affairs.

References

Notes

New Order (Indonesia)
Cabinets of Indonesia
1978 establishments in Indonesia
1983 disestablishments in Indonesia
Cabinets established in 1978
Cabinets disestablished in 1983
Suharto